Mollakamallı  (also, Kuybışevkənd, Mollakemally, and Molla-Kemanly) is a village and municipality in the Davachi Rayon of Azerbaijan. It has a population of 275.

References 

Populated places in Shabran District